Titus Flavius Sabinus was the name of several notable Ancient Romans, including:

 Titus Flavius Sabinus, father of the emperor Vespasian.
 Titus Flavius Sabinus, brother of Vespasian, was consul suffectus in AD 47 and praefectus urbi under the emperor Nero.
 Titus Flavius Sabinus, consul suffectus in AD 69, and probably a nephew of Vespasian.
 Titus Flavius Sabinus, consul suffectus in AD 82, nephew of Vespasian, and son of the consul of 47.

Titus
Ancient Roman prosopographical lists